Janez Matičič (3 June 1926 – 18 April 2022) was a Slovenian composer and pianist. He was a regular member of the Slovenian Academy of Sciences and Arts starting in 2007.

Matičič was born in Ljubljana, and was the brother of writer . He graduated in composition from the Ljubljana Academy of Music in 1950 and conducting in 1951. From 1959 to 1961 he studied in Paris with Nadia Boulanger.  Then, from 1959 to 1975, he collaborated with the Groupe de Recherches Musicales, who were experimenting with electroacoustic music under the direction of Pierre Schaeffer.

Among Matičič's works are two concertos for piano and orchestra, a concerto for cello and orchestra, and a number of pieces created in a modernist and experimental mode. In 2007 he received the Prešeren Award for his lifetime achievement in music. He died in April 17, 2022, at the age of 95.

See also
List of Slovenian composers

References

External Links
 
 

1926 births
2022 deaths
Slovenian classical composers
Male classical composers
Slovenian classical pianists
Prešeren Award laureates
Musicians from Ljubljana
University of Ljubljana alumni
Slovenian male musicians